John Michael Prausnitz (born January 7, 1928) is a professor of chemical engineering at the University of California, Berkeley, a position he has held since 1955. 

Prausnitz received his Ph.D. in chemical engineering from Princeton University in 1955 after completing a doctoral dissertation titled "Liquid-phase turbulent mixing properties." 

Prausnitz is responsible for many of the activity coefficient models used for the design of major chemical plants. He is a recipient of the National Medal of Science in the field of engineering for his work in engineering-oriented molecular thermodynamics.

He was elected a member of the National Academy of Engineering in 1979 for contributions to the thermodynamics of phase equilibria and its application to industrial process design.
He was the founding editor of the Annual Review of Chemical and Biomolecular Engineering in 2010.

References

Living people
1928 births
American chemical engineers
UC Berkeley College of Chemistry faculty
National Medal of Science laureates
Cornell University alumni
University of Rochester alumni
Princeton University alumni
Annual Reviews (publisher) editors
Fellows of the American Academy of Arts and Sciences
Members of the United States National Academy of Engineering